The 2007 FINA Swimming World Cup occurred in autumn 2007. It was an international series of short course (25m) swimming competitions organised by FINA.

The 2007 edition marked a return to all World Cup meets being held in the same year for a given series, with them all held within October and November 2007. Swimmers from FINA members were allowed to compete.

Venues

Competition programme
The event schedule for all meets was the same: a 2-day format, all events both day with men swimming half and females the other half (genders switch events for the second day, thereby swimming all events per gender). All events are short course (25m) format, and all are prelims/finals except for the women's 800 free and men's 1500 free which are timed finals (swum just once). For meets 1-6, prelims and finals were the same day; for meet 7 (Belo Horizonte), prelims were held in the afternoon with finals the next morning (causing its 3-dates for the meet).

Event order

Day 1
800 m freestyle women
100 m freestyle men
200 m freestyle women
50 m breaststroke men
100 m breaststroke women
400 m IM men
100 m butterfly women
100 m backstroke men
50 m backstroke women
200 m butterfly men
200 m IM women
400 m freestyle men
50 m freestyle women
200 m breaststroke men
100 m IM men
200 m backstroke women
50 m butterfly men

Day 2
1500 m freestyle men
100 m freestyle women
200 m freestyle men
50 m breaststroke women
100 m breaststroke men
400 m IM women
100 m butterfly men
100 m backstroke women
50 m backstroke men
200 m butterfly women
200 m IM men
400 m freestyle women
50 m freestyle men
200 m breaststroke women
100 m IM women
200 m backstroke men
50 m butterfly women

Event winners
WR denotes World Record, WC denotes World Cup Record.
Time listed in header is the series record at the start of the 2007 World Cup.

50m Freestyle

100m Freestyle

200m Freestyle

400m Freestyle

1500m/800m Freestyle

50m Backstroke

100m Backstroke

200m Backstroke

50m Breaststroke

100m Breaststroke

200m Breaststroke

50m Butterfly

100m Butterfly

200m Butterfly

100m Individual Medley

200m Individual Medley

400m Individual Medley

References

FINA Swimming World Cup
FINA Swimming World Cup, 2007